Sarto is an Italian surname, and may refer to:

People 
Sarto Fournier (1909 – 1980), Canadian politician.
Andrea del Sarto (1486 – 1531), Italian painter from Florence.
Antônio Sarto (1926–2008), Brazilian bishop.
Giuseppe Sarto (1835–1914), Pope Pius X.
Mario Sarto (1885–1955), Italian sculptor
Leonardo Sarto (1992-), Italian Rugby Union player

Places 
Sarto, Manitoba

Occupational surnames
Italian-language surnames